Juan Alvarado may refer to:

 Juan José Alvarado (1798–1857), Supreme Director of Honduras from 15 April 1839 to 27 April 1839
 Juan Bautista Alvarado (1809–1882), Californio and Governor of Alta California
 Juan Velasco Alvarado (1910–1977), Peruvian general and the 58th President of Peru
 Juan Alvarado (Chilean footballer) (1893–1969), Chilean football midfielder
 Juan Alvarado (Mexican footballer) (born 1948), Mexican football striker
 Juan Carlos Alvarado (born 1968), Christian pop singer